The Dunging script or Iban script is a quasi-syllabary script used to write the Iban language of Sarawak. It was invented in 1947 by its namesake, Dunging anak Gunggu (1904–1985), who revised the initial 77 glyphs to the current 59 glyphs in 1962. It has not been used widely until Dr. Bromeley Philip of Universiti Teknologi MARA begun to promote the script again in 2012.

In 2010, extending Dunging's work, Dr Bromeley Philip of Universiti Teknologi MARA (UiTM) Sarawak developed computer fonts for the Iban alphabet, called LaserIban. His aim is to help preserve the Iban alphabet in digital form in the modern world. The LaserIban is available for Windows and Macintosh computers and is completely cross-platform compatible. LaserIban however, is a legacy typeface encoded onto the Latin block of Unicode, thereby limiting its range of use in computers.

References

Writing systems of Asia
Sarawak
Ibanic languages
1947 establishments in Sarawak
Syllabary writing systems
Writing systems introduced in 1947